Raja Basu Dev High School is an Indian school located in Debagarh (also known as Deogarh), Odisha.

History
It was established in 1882 by Raja Basudev Sudhal Dev, the ruler of the princely state of Bamra (also known as Bamada). Originally known as Raja Kumar High School and based in a royal palace, it later moved to its own premises and was renamed as Raja Basudev High School.

The school was renamed after and is founder, Raja Basudev, who was an educationalist and one of the pioneers of the modern Odisha and the Oriya language.

There was only one primary school in Bamra when Raja Basudev took over the reign of the state. He increased the number of primary schools to 28, established one high school at Deogarh, the state capital of Bamra State, and it was affiliated with the Calcutta University.

The ruler kept close contact with the veteran educationalists of Bengal and recruited good scholars for the posts of teachers in the high school.

The school was a pioneer in spreading education in the district of Deogarh.

Alumni
There are many scholars who graduated from this high school and are spread across the globe in universities, multinational companies and government departments.

See also

 List of schools in Odisha

References 
Behera, Dr. Antaryami (April–May 2009). Sir Basudev Sudhal Dev – The Pioneer of Modern Orissa".     Tanka Dhar Dash is the 1st matriculate of Bamra states and he passed his matriculation in the year 1910 at Calcutta.  Orissa Review.  Retrieved 11 May 2016.

1882 establishments in India
Debagarh district
Educational institutions established in 1882
High schools and secondary schools in Odisha
Schools in the princely states of India